Cyperus fuligineus is a species of sedge that is native to southern parts of North America and parts of the Caribbean.

See also 
 List of Cyperus species

References 

fuligineus
Plants described in 1860
Flora of Florida
Flora of the Bahamas
Flora of Cuba
Flora of Haiti
Flora of Puerto Rico
Flora of the Netherlands Antilles
Taxa named by Alvan Wentworth Chapman
Flora without expected TNC conservation status